Temple Hill Entertainment or Temple Hill Productions is an American film and television production company, established in 2006 by producers Wyck Godfrey and Marty Bowen. The studio produced the Twilight film series. Recently, the studio signed a TV deal with Lionsgate.

Filmography

Films

Upcoming films

Television

TV series

References

Mass media companies established in 2006
Film production companies of the United States
American companies established in 2006